The Château de La Ferté-Imbault (Loir-et-Cher) is a stately home in the Loire Valley, France. A fortress in the Middle Ages and rebuilt in the Renaissance, it is the largest brick château in Sologne, and one of the oldest. It was the family seat of the House of d'Estampes for four centuries.

The seigneurie (lordship) of La Ferte-Imbault was the most important of the south of Sologne, and whose jurisdiction included the parishes of Salbris, Saint-Genou (now Selles-Saint-Denis), Marcilly, Loreux and Souesmes. It comprised more than one hundred farms spread over thousands of hectares, stretching from Loreux to Souesmes and from Saint-Viâtre to the limits of Theillay.

The château is a "rectangular building, with large windows and flanked by four towers of massifs and alleys of trees, an air of grandeur and poetry that strikes, everything at the same time, the heart and the imagination".(François Coillard) Its position "is quite pleasant and joyful, in a place where the Sauldre is divided into several channels ... The red turrets of the château expand amid these waters and this greenery, and crown wonderfully the rich picture".(Louis de La Saussaye)

History
A Roman occupation was found on the site of the present château.

A first fortress was built around 980 by Humbold (or Humbault) Le Tortu, Seigneur de Vierzon and son-in-law of Thibault, comte de Blois. The proximity of the Sauldre feeds the moat. The bases of the two main towers remain to this day as the old weapons room. Hervé 1st, Seigneur de Vierzon and descendant of Humbold, had built on his return from the crusade, a collegiate in honor of Saint-Taurin. This ecclesiastical presence and the need to supply the fortress favor the emergence of the village of La Ferté-Imbault which is built around. In 1280 Jeanne de Vierzon, heiress of the lands of La Ferté-Imbault, weds Geoffroy de Brabant, comte d'Aerschot, son of duc Henry III de Brabant and Adelaide de Bourgogne (Burgundy). Geoffroy de Brabant was the brother-in-law of the King of France, Philip III the Bold. His daughter, Alix de Brabant, married Jean III d'Harcourt in 1302. His marriage to Alix de Brabant, a rich heiress who brought him the seigneurie of La Ferté-Imbault, made him a close relative of the Duke of Brabant and the Kings of France, because Alix is also the niece of the Queen of France, Marie de Brabant.

The son of Jean III d'Harcourt and Alix de Brabant, Jean IV, first comte d'Harcourt, marries Isabeau de Parthenay. Their sons Guillaume d'Harcourt is the seigneur of La Ferté-Imbault. From his marriage to Blanche de Bray, Dame de Cernon, they had one daughter, Jeanne d'Harcourt, Dame de La Ferte-Imbault, who married Hugues de Montmorency. Their sons, Louis and Antoine, died at the Battle of Azincourt in 1415 for the first, and Verneuil in 1424 for the second. Their sister, Catherine de Montmorency, inherits the vast estate of La Ferté-Imbault after the death of her two brothers.

During the Hundred Years War, the castle was taken and destroyed by the troops of Edward the Black Prince, as well as the village. After having belonged without interruption during several centuries to the dynasty of Humbold Le Tortu, Seigneur of Vierzon, by the alliance of the families of Brabant, Harcourt and Montmorency, the estate is sold by Catherine de Montmorency to Robert II d'Estampes, Seigneur de Valençay, in 1424.

Joan of Arc stayed at La Ferté-Imbault on March 4, 1429.

The castle was rebuilt during the Renaissance. The royal power was nearby, in Blois, and Francis I of France came from Romorantin neighboring the land of La Ferté-Imbault.

Partially destroyed by a fire during the Wars of Religion in 1562, the castle was rebuilt and enlarged by the addition of two wings and large commons in the early seventeenth century by Jacques d'Estampes, marquis de Mauny, who was the richest landlord of the region, and the grandson of Guillaume de Hautemer, the duc de Grancey of France, better known under the name of marshal de Fervaques (Stendhal used this name for one of the characters of Le rouge et le noir (The Red and the Black), the maréchale de Fervaques). Jacques d'Estampes, head of the House of d'Estampes, was also be the first marquis of La Ferté-Imbault. His eldest son was Seigneur de Salbris. Born in the reign of Henry IV, the marquis de La Ferté-Imbault died in the reign of Louis XIV, after fighting alongside Louis XIII (whose bust still adorns the former guardhouse of the château). He was ambassador to England (1641-1643), lieutenant-general of Orléanais, Vendômois and Dunois (1645), and marshal of France (1651). Louis XIV made him knight of the Order of the Holy Spirit (1661). His friendship with HRH Gaston of France, Duc d'Orléans and brother of Louis XIII (Monsieur, the King's brother), was flawless throughout his life, and it is as a lieutenant of the company of the Gendarmes of the Duc d 'Orléans (in 1620) that he had huge commons built at the Château de La Ferté-Imbault to accommodate his company. His wife, Catherine-Blanche of Choiseul (whose godfathers are the Grand Sully and the Prince de Rohan), whose father is Charles de Choiseul, marquis de Praslin, advisor to Marie de Medici and one of the most remarkable men of the end of the sixteenth century), will be first lady-in-waiting of HRH la Duchesse d'Orléans. The château knows its apogee at the Grand-Siècle. The hearts of the maréchal d'Estampes and his wife, Madame la Marquise d'Estampes de la Ferté-Imbault, remained at La Ferté-Imbault, in the chapel of Saint-Taurin, under a moving epitaph. The full-length portrait of the maréchal d'Estampes de La Ferté-Imbault was made in 1835 by Jean-Léonard Lugardon on the orders of King Louis-Philippe. It is in the sixth hall of the marshals, the historical museum of the Palace of Versailles.

In the eighteenth century, the Regent who ruled France since the death of Louis XIV, renamed the regiment of Chartres-Infantry to give it the name of La Ferté-Imbault regiment.

In 1743, King Louis XV acquired the marquisate of La Ferte-Imbault for his mistress, Madame de La Tournelle, on whom he wanted to confer a prestigious title to present to the court. Madame de La Tournelle eventually became Duchesse de Châteauroux.

The last marquise de La Ferté-Imbault was Marie-Thérèse Geoffrin d'Estampes, daughter of the illustrious Madame Geoffrin, whose literary salon in the rue Saint-Honoré radiated throughout Europe and as far as Russia where the Empress Catherine II wrote to her as a friend. The beautiful marquise, whose magnificent painting by Nattier is exhibited in Tokyo at the Fuji Art Museum, enjoyed at La Ferté "the freshness of large chestnut trees that extend their shade at the end of the Commons". Her presence was, however, requested in Versailles, where, on the recommendation of the governess of the Enfants de France, the comtesse de Marsan, Louis XV asked her to teach philosophy to his granddaughters, the Princesses Elisabeth and Clotilde de France (sisters of the Duc de Berry, future Louis XVI). She also provided Madame de Marsan with texts for the little comedies played by the princesses to whom the Dauphin and the Dauphine (Marie Antoinette) were present. Madame de La Ferté-Imbault will be invited to the coronation of Louis XVI in Reims on June 11, 1775. Smart, a woman of letters having regularly attended in the salon of her mother most of the great minds of the Enlightenment (Diderot, Voltaire, Fontenelle, Montesquieu who was his tutor, D'Alembert ...), and never remarried despite his young widowhood (and several marriage proposals including that of Stanislas Leszczynski, King of Poland, and father of the Queen of France Marie Leszczynska, who called la marquise "his Imbault" ), Madame de La Ferté-Imbault was recognized for her culture and her moral qualities. Queen of the "Sublime Order of Lanturelus", brotherhood of beautiful minds, she knows how to resist the intrigues of the Court, and attach the friendship of the Royal Family (including Madame Elizabeth who wrote to her "You must love, said a princess. I go further, for I love you, Imbault, and I challenge and criticize and rivals, to find nothing to say to my tenderness ", and Louis Joseph de Bourbon, Prince de Condé, who invites her at Chantilly and will seek always with her advice, help and consolation) courtiers and favorites like the Marquise de Pompadour who was her friend.

The French Revolution saw the fall of the House of d'Estampes and the loss of influence of the Château de La Ferté-Imbault. Its surrounding village was then attached to the neighboring town of Selles-Saint-Denis. The two wings of the château were torn down. The marquis de Pierrecourt, son of Sophie d'Estampes, owner of the château, was imprisoned during the Reign of Terror. He sold the estate in 1807 to the Comte de Belmont. The widow of the latter sold it in 1819 to the comtesse de Grandeffe.

In May 1824, a rich English family, the Leeds-Kirby from Leeds, acquired the estate of La Ferte-Imbault and moved to the château. They modernized local agriculture by adopting English cultural innovations (forage plants and improving crops, such as clover and alfalfa) in their many farms spread over 5,000 hectares. The presence of this foreign family was unappreciated in the village. For example, during the Revolution of 1830, the population of La Ferté-Imbault, armed with pitchforks and spades, invaded the château and sought to lynch the fleeing owner. The Protestant practice of the family, coupled with a strong proselytism, led to serious opposition to the village community throughout the nineteenth century, as in 1868 during the construction of the new parish church of Saint-Taurin, built in front of the main entrance to the château. When William Lee died in 1853, his nephew and niece inherited the estate of La Ferté-Imbault and the estate was divided into two parts, the Sauldre forming the boundary. Mary-Ann Kirby received the château and part of the farms on 3,500 hectares, while Edward Howarth, his brother, received other farms and the area of La Place on the right bank of the river (on which a new château was built between 1880 and 1883), for a total surface of 1,500 hectares.

The village regained its administrative independence in 1860 but faced financial problems. The former collegiate church near the château was destroyed.

The château, whose land was significantly reduced after 1872 (to a little over 1,100 hectares), was bought by Comte Fresson. His niece, Marie Say, one of the richest heiresses of France and owner of the Château de Chaumont-sur-Loire, married Prince Amédée de Broglie, then HRH prince Louis-Ferdinand d'Orléans-Bourbon, Infant of Spain. Many trips were undertaken between these two châteaux united by family ties. The park of about 50 hectares was fenced at that time by a brick wall and embellished with ornaments.

The Château de la Ferté-Imbault, sold in 1900 to Dr. Georges Bouilly, then become the property of Henry-René Bertrand, and was seized by the Kommandantur on June 17, 1940, and saw four years of German occupation. The building suffered extensive damage during a bombing raid on May 8, 1944. In August 1960, a "sound and light" show tracing its millennial history was organized in the castle with the voices of the actors Madeleine Sologne and André Le Gall. It has since been sold to new private owners and is open to visitors during the summer period.

Architecture
The present stately home is the one restored by marshal d'Estampes during the first quarter of the 17th century and completed in 1627. It is a high brick building erected on an old mound leveled in a succession of two terraces above the moat.

The building is located behind (north side) by the two cylindrical towers of the sixteenth century that resisted the fire of 1562, and in front (south side) by two polygonal towers whose base goes back to the construction of the medieval castle. The facade delimited by these last towers is dominated by an imposing fore-body covered with a pyramidal dome and crowned with a lantern and bells (also called the bell tower). The stone appears in tables and alternating claveaux around the windows. Three slate roofs are built parallel to this façade

Several large windows of the eastern facade retain a Renaissance decor made of grotesques and historical medallions. This facade also has a polychrome grid and testifies that the stone was hardly used to play a decorative role. In the main building, were added two wings disappeared for one at the end of the eighteenth century and for the other at the beginning of the nineteenth century, following a fire (which also destroyed the main wood staircase located in the bell tower, rebuilt in 1830).

Two pavilions are built at the end of the moat: the first for the guardhouse and the second for kitchens with a well that still exists, and whose ground floor is vaulted by a series of powerful arches diaphragms in brick. The moats that surround this quadrilateral on all sides are built with a bridge that spans them. Four watch-towers (two of which are still standing) with domes are arranged, pierced with openings to allow shots, which stand at the corners of the walkway overlooking the moat. The roofs of the pavilions resumed the shape adopted by the fore-body of the dwelling and that of the escugettes

The bridge gives access to two large bodies of common, particularly remarkable, which frame the forecourt of the château: they served as stables and cantonment for the company of Gendarmes of the Duc d'Orléans that the marshal d'Estampes directed "the installation of the light horse that he maintains in his superb common is reassuring for all".) These outbuildings were to house a total population of 600 including officers, 120 horsemen, grooms, farriers and about 240 horses. These long outbuildings are framed by large pavilions covered with high eaves.

The farm with housing, barns and kennel was rebuilt a little further apart in the barnyard.

The magnificent red brick ensemble is typical of the classicism that developed at the end of the Renaissance and during the reign of Louis XIII.

In the mid-nineteenth century, when the château was owned by the English Lee-Kirby family, large neo-Gothic arcades were placed in front of the medieval base of the main facade, and the imperial roofs of the pavilions destroyed by fire in 1830 were rebuilt in the form of two-slope English-inspired roofs.

The area which now extends over fifty hectares is enclosed by a brick wall surrounded by the Sauldre. Marshal d'Estampes had French gardens (transformed in the nineteenth century according to the English fashion), built an orangery, and dug a vast 600-meter canal, fed by the river, which survived. A vegetable garden, a cooler, meadows, cultivated land and woodlands make up a romantic territory. A network of star alleys serves the park. Many species of trees are found there as well as an abundant game.

References

Further Reading: 
 List of Châteaux of Loir-et-Cher
 List of historical monuments of Loir-et-Cher
 Jacques d'Estampes

Châteaux in Loir-et-Cher
Châteaux of the Loire Valley
Monuments historiques of Centre-Val de Loire
Ancien Régime French architecture